Jan Stallich (1907–1973) was a Czechoslovak cinematographer who worked in several European film industries including Great Britain, France, Germany, Italy and Spain as well as in his native country. He worked on over a hundred films during his career.

Selected filmography
 St. Wenceslas (1929)
 Chudá holka (1929)
 Ecstasy (1933)
 The Mystery of the Blue Room (1933)
 The Inspector General (1933)
 The River (1933)
 A Woman Who Knows What She Wants (1934)
 Le Golem (1935)
 The Silent Passenger (1935)
 Lonely Road (1936)
 Everything in Life (1936)
 Whom the Gods Love (1936)
 Guilty Melody (1936)
 Three Maxims (1936)
 Moonlight Sonata (1937)
 The Show Goes On (1937)
 Who's Your Lady Friend? (1937)
 The Fornaretto of Venice (1939)
 Saint Rogelia (1940)
 Abandonment (1940)
 Captain Fracasse (1940)
 The Daughter of the Green Pirate (1940)
 The Sin of Rogelia Sanchez (1940)
 The Siege of the Alcazar (1940)
 The Mask of Cesare Borgia (1941)
 Caravaggio (1941)
 The Mask of Cesare Borgia (1941)
 Vienna Blood (1942)
 Women Are No Angels (1943)
 Viennese Girls (1945)
 Temno (1950)
 The Emperor and the Golem (1952)
 Dovolená s Andělem (1952)
 The Secret of Blood (1953)
 The Secret of the Chinese Carnation (1964)
 Massacre at Marble City (1964)
 People on Wheels (1966)
  (1966)

Bibliography
 Hames, Peter. Czech and Slovak Cinema: Theme and Tradition. Edinburgh University Press, 2009.

External links

1907 births
1973 deaths
Czechoslovak cinematographers
Mass media people from Prague